Kleine Kulmke is river of Lower Saxony, Germany, in the Harz Mountains, a tributary of the Große Kulmke.

The Kleine Kulmke rises at a height of 690 m near the Schmierplatz on the Auf dem Acker ridge north-northeast of Sieber in the district of Göttingen and flows initially southwards to its confluence with the Verlorene Kulmke ("Lost Kulmke", 428 m), from which it is separated by the Kleiner Wurzelnberg hill. It then flows in a southwest to south-southwest direction before uniting with the Große Kulmke ("Big Kulmke") after  at a height of 392 m. The valley of the Kleine Kulmke partly belongs to the Sieber Valley (Siebertal) nature reserve.

See also 
List of rivers of Lower Saxony

Sources 
Topographische Karte 1:25000, No. 4228 Riefensbeek

External links
Sieber Valley Nature Reserve at the website of the Lower Saxon State Department for Waterway, Coastal and Nature Conservation (NLWKN) 

Rivers of Lower Saxony
Rivers of the Harz
Göttingen (district)
Rivers of Germany